Acht van Chaam is an elite men's and women's professional road bicycle racing event held annually in Chaam, Netherlands. The first edition was in 1932 and since 1992 the event also includes a women's race.

Results

Men 
Source:

Women 

Source:

Organization

Theo van der Westerlaken
Since 1971 the competition was organized by Theo van der Westerlaken (1949 – 14 July 2020), the son of the founder of Acht van Chaam. For his works he was awarded by the Royal Dutch Cycling Union with the "Gouden Wiel" (translated: Golden Wheel) in July 2020. A week later van der Westerlaken died on 14 July due to an illness, aged 71. A plaque on the cycling monument opposite his house in the center of Chaam will be placed by the board of Acht van Chaam.

References

External links

 

Men's road bicycle races
Women's road bicycle races
Recurring sporting events established in 1932
1932 establishments in the Netherlands
Cycling in North Brabant
Sport in Alphen-Chaam